Eve is a 2015 children's series broadcast on CBBC that ran for three series.

Series overview

Episodes

Series 1 (2015)

Christmas Special (2015)

Series 2 (2016)

Series 3 (2016)

References

Lists of British children's television series episodes
Lists of British science fiction television series episodes